"Mony Mony" is a 1968 single by American pop rock band Tommy James and the Shondells, which reached No. 1 in the UK Singles Chart and No. 3 in the U.S. Written by Bobby Bloom, Ritchie Cordell, Bo Gentry and Tommy James, the song has appeared in various film and television works such as the Oliver Stone drama Heaven & Earth. It was also covered by English singer-songwriter Billy Idol in 1981. Idol's version, which took in more of a rock sound, became an international top 40 hit and additionally revived public interest in the original garage rock single. In 1986 it was covered by Amazulu, who gave it a ska rendition.

Tommy James and the Shondells version

Background and release
"Mony Mony" was credited to Tommy James, Bo Gentry, Ritchie Cordell and Bobby Bloom. The song's title was inspired by Tommy James' view of the "M.O.N.Y." sign atop the Mutual of New York Building on the New York City skyline from his Manhattan apartment. As James said in a 1995 interview in Hitch magazine:

"Mony Mony" was the only song by the group to reach the top 20 in the United Kingdom; it reached No. 1 in the UK, No. 3 in the U.S. and Canada, and became a Top 10 hit across western Europe. A music video was made featuring the band performing the song amidst psychedelic backgrounds. A decade and a half later, it would receive renewed play on MTV.

Track listings and format
 Vinyl
 "Mony Mony" – 2:45
 "One Two Three and I Fell" – 2:32

Chart performance

Billy Idol version

Background and release
British rock artist Billy Idol released a cover version in 1981 (on the Don't Stop EP). Along with the track "Baby Talk", Idol's version of "Mony Mony" went to No. 7 on the Billboard dance chart. In his 2015 memoir, Dancing With Myself, he recalls his affection for the song originally stemmed from a sexual encounter he had as a youth where it played in the background. Before proposing the cover to executives at Chrysalis Records, he originally suggested recording a cover of "Shout" before admitting his intentions for "Mony Mony".  A live recording of the song became a hit for Idol in 1987 as well, while promoting his then-forthcoming compilation work Vital Idol. The live version was released as a single and went to No. 1 on the Billboard Hot 100, coincidentally displacing Tiffany's cover of another Tommy James song, "I Think We're Alone Now", from the top spot. It also finished directly behind the Tiffany song at No. 19 in the 1987 year-end Billboard chart. 

Idol's version gave rise to an interesting custom. When the song was performed live in concert or played at a club or dance, people would shout a certain formulaic (and usually obscene) variation of a particular phrase in the two measures following each line, for example, "Hey, say what… get laid get fucked!" Or "Hey, motherfucker… get laid get fucked!" This led to the song being banned at high-school dances across North America, although the custom continues at Idol concerts & sporting events today. It became so widespread that Idol would eventually commit the lyrics to record in the "Idol/Stevens Mix" of the song on the 2018 remix album Vital Idol: Revitalized.

Idol revived interest in the original garage rock song. The full studio version can be found on Idol's Greatest Hits compilation album, a 2001 Capitol Records release. That album has received positive critical reviews, with Idol's cover of the James tune specifically praised.

Uses in popular culture
"Weird Al" Yankovic wrote a parody of this song from his album Even Worse, entitled "Alimony" (based on the live Idol version, complete with a live audience). It is about a recently divorced man complaining about his ex-wife taking everything he owns away from him in alimony payments.

Track listings and formats
(1981) US 7" vinyl
"Mony Mony" (Single Edit) 3:23
"Baby Talk" 3:10

(1981) UK 7" vinyl (33⅓ rpm) & 12" vinyl (45rpm)
"Mony Mony"
"Baby Talk"
"Untouchables"
"Dancing With Myself"

(1987) UK 7" vinyl
"Mony Mony (Live)"
"Shakin' All Over (Live)"
(1987) US 12" vinyl
"Mony Mony (Hung Like a Pony Remix)" 6:59
"Mony Mony (Steel-Toe Cat Dub)" 6:50
"Mony Mony (Live) 4:00"
"Mony Mony (Incorrectly listed as Single Edit)" 5:01
(1987) UK 12" vinyl
"Mony Mony (Hung Like a Pony Remix♰)"
"Shakin' All Over (Live)"
"Mony Mony (Live)"
♰Mixed by – Tom Lord-Alge

Chart performance
Original version

Live version

Certifications

References

1968 singles
Tommy James and the Shondells songs
The Beach Boys songs
UK Singles Chart number-one singles
1981 singles
1987 singles
Billy Idol songs
Billboard Hot 100 number-one singles
Cashbox number-one singles
Songs written by Tommy James
RPM Top Singles number-one singles
Songs written by Ritchie Cordell
Songs written by Bobby Bloom
Roulette Records singles
1968 songs
Chrysalis Records singles
Songs written by Bo Gentry